The 1770 Port-au-Prince earthquake took place at 7:15 pm local time on June 3, on the Enriquillo fault near Port-au-Prince, Saint-Domingue, the French colony that is now the country of Haiti.

Damage
The earthquake was strong enough to destroy Port-au-Prince, and leveled all the buildings between Lake Miragoâne and Petit-Goâve, to the west of Port-au-Prince. The Plain of the Cul-de-Sac, a rift valley under Port-au-Prince that extends eastwards into the Dominican Republic, experienced extensive soil liquefaction. The ground under Port-au-Prince liquefied, throwing down all its buildings, including those that had survived the 1751 earthquake. One village, Croix des Bouquets, sank below sea level. Some chimneys on the distant island of Jamaica collapsed.

It is estimated that 200 people died in Port-au-Prince in collapsed buildings, including 79 of the 80 people in Port-au-Prince's hospital. The death toll would have been higher, but the earthquake was preceded by a rumbling noise that gave people time to flee their houses before the main tremor, which consisted of two shocks lasting a total of four minutes. Fifty people died in Léogâne.

Tsunami

Aftermath
The aftermath of the earthquake saw much more death as thousands of slaves escaped in the chaos, the local economy collapsed and 15,000 slaves died in the subsequent famine. An additional 15,000 people died from what is thought to have been gastrointestinal anthrax from eating tainted meat bought from Spanish traders.

See also
 List of earthquakes in Haiti
 List of historical earthquakes
 List of historical tsunamis

References

Further reading
 

1770 Haiti earthquake
Port-au-prince Earthquake, 1770
Port-au-prince Earthquake, 1770
1770 tsunamis
Saint-Domingue
18th century in Haiti